Serp i Molot is a rural locality (a settlement) and the administrative center of Serpo-Molotskoye Rural Settlement, Novonikolayevsky District, Volgograd Oblast, Russia. The population was 875 as of 2010. There are 13 streets.

Geography 
Serp i Molot is located in steppe, on the Khopyorsko-Buzulukskaya Plai, 24 km southeast of Novonikolayevsky (the district's administrative centre) by road. Kulikovsky is the nearest rural locality.

References 

Rural localities in Novonikolayevsky District